The following is a list of female action heroes and villains who appear in action films, television shows, comic books, and video games and who are "thrust into a series of challenges requiring physical feats, extended fights, extensive stunts and frenetic chases."

Elizabeth Abele suggests that "the key agency of female action protagonists is their ability to draw on the full range of masculine and feminine qualities in ever-evolving combinations."

Films

Animated theatrical films

 Ahsoka Tano from Star Wars: The Clone Wars
 Princess Fiona from the Shrek series (2001-2010), Queen Lillian and the Fairy Godmother from Shrek 2, and Snow White, Cinderella, and Sleeping Beauty from Shrek the Third (2007)
 Elastigirl and Violet (2004) from The Incredibles (2004)
 Iria from Iria: Zeiram the Animation
 Judy Hopps from Zootopia (2016)
 Kay from Akira
 Kida and Helga Sinclair from Atlantis: The Lost Empire (2001)
 Merida from Brave (2012)
 Moana from Moana
 Motoko Kusanagi from Ghost in the Shell
 Mulan from Mulan (1998) and Mulan II (2004)
 Nausicaä from Nausicaä of the Valley of the Wind
 Raya from Raya and the Last Dragon (2020)
 Ryôko Kadoma from Goku Midnight Eye
 Sabine Wren from Star Wars Rebels
 San from Princess Mononoke
 Susan Murphy/Ginormica from Monsters vs. Aliens (2009)
 Saya from Blood: The Last Vampire
 Saki Asamiya from Sukeban Deka (Original video animation)
 April O'Neil from TMNT (film)
 Liz Sherman from Hellboy: Sword of Storms, Hellboy: Blood and Iron

Live-action theatrical films

 Æon Flux from Æon Flux (2005)
 Abigail Whistler from Blade: Trinity (2004)
 Alex Munday from Charlie's Angels (2000) and Charlie's Angels: Full Throttle (2003)
 Alice Kingsleigh from Alice in Wonderland (2010 film) and Alice Through the Looking Glass (2016 film)
 Alice Monaghan from Hellboy (2019)
 Amélie Poulain from Amélie (2001)
 April O'Neil from Teenage Mutant Ninja Turtles (2014 film), Teenage Mutant Ninja Turtles: Out of the Shadows
 Arwen from The Lord of the Rings trilogy
 Artemisia from 300: Rise of an Empire (2014)
 Ava from In the Blood (2014 film) (2014) 
 Babydoll from Sucker Punch (2011)
 Beatrix Kiddo from Kill Bill (2003–2004)
 Buffy Summers from Buffy the Vampire Slayer (1992)
 Black Whip from Zorro's Black Whip (1944)
 Blue from Jurassic World (2015), Jurassic World: Fallen Kingdom (2018), Jurassic World Camp Cretaceous (2020-2022), and Jurassic World Dominion (2022)
 Bugs from The Matrix Resurrections (2021)
Carol Danvers (Captain Marvel) from Marvel Cinematic Universe
 Carly Spencer from Transformers: Dark of the Moon
 Captain Frankie Cook from Sky Captain and the World of Tomorrow (2004)
 Charlene "Charly" Baltimore/Samantha Caine from The Long Kiss Goodnight (1996 film)
 Charlie Watson from Bumblebee (film)
 Cherry Darling from Grindhouse (2007)
 Coffy from Coffy (1973)
 Daphne Blake from Scooby-Doo (2002) and Scooby-Doo 2: Monsters Unleashed (2004)
 Dylan Sanders from Charlie's Angels (2000) and Charlie's Angels: Full Throttle (2003)
 Dominika Egorova from Red Sparrow (2018)
 Domino from Domino (2005)
 Elizabeth "Liz" Sherman from Hellboy (2004)
 Elena Santos from Battle: Los Angeles (2011)
 Elizabeth Swann from the Pirates of the Caribbean series (2003-2007)
 Ellen "The Lady" from The Quick and the Dead (1995)
 Ellen Ripley from the Alien series (1979-1997)
 Etain from Centurion (2010)
 Everly from Everly (2014)
 Evelyn Salt from Salt (2010)
 Fox from Wanted (2008)
 Foxy Brown from Foxy Brown (1974)
 Foxxy Cleopatra from Austin Powers in Goldmember
 Gena Rowlands from Gloria (1980)
 Gracie Hart in Miss Congeniality
 Guinevere from King Arthur (2004)
 Hanna from Hanna (2011)
 Ilsa Faust from Mission: Impossible – Rogue Nation (2015) and Fallout (2018)
 Imperator Furiosa from Mad Max: Fury Road (2015)
 Inspector Jessica Yang from Supercop (1992)
 Iria from Zeiram (1991)
 Jane Smith from Mr. & Mrs. Smith (2005)
 Jackie Brown from Jackie Brown (1997)
 Jen Yu from Crouching Tiger, Hidden Dragon (2000)
 Jordan O'Neil from G.I. Jane (1997)
 Julie Pierce from The Next Karate Kid (1994)
 Jyn Erso from Rogue One (2016)
 Kate Macer from Sicario (2015)
 Leeloo / The Fifth Element from The Fifth Element (1997)
 Ann Lewis from RoboCop
 Letty Ortiz, Gisele Yashar, Elena Neves, Riley Hicks and Kara from The Fast and The Furious (2001–present)
 Princess Leia Organa from the Star Wars original trilogy (1977–1983)
 Lorraine Broughton from Atomic Blonde (2017)
 Lucy from Lucy (2014)
 Madame Desdemona from Machete Kills (2013)
 Mai Linh from Live Free or Die Hard (2007)
 Major Eden Sinclair from Doomsday (2008) 
 Mallory Kane from Haywire (2011)
 Marie from Innocent Blood
 Mathilda from The Professional (1994)
 Mako Mori from Pacific Rim (2013)
 Madison Lee from Charlie's Angels: Full Throttle (2003)
 Marion Ravenwood from Raiders of the Lost Ark (1981)
 Marique from Conan the Barbarian (2011)
 Mei from House of Flying Daggers (2004)
 Mikaela Banes from Transformers (film)
 Monica "Darling" Costello from Baby Driver (2017)
 Mira Killian from Ghost in the Shell (2017)
 Vanessa Kensington from Austin Powers: International Man of Mystery
 Ms. Perkins from John Wick (2014)
 Natalie Cook from Charlie's Angels (2000) and Charlie's Angels: Full Throttle (2003)
 Natasha Romanoff (Black Widow) from Marvel Cinematic Universe
 Newt from Aliens (1986)
 Neytiri from Avatar (2009)
 Nikita from La Femme Nikita (1990)
 Niobe from The Matrix series (2003–2021)
 Padmé Amidala from the Star Wars prequel trilogy (1999–2005)
 Pauline Hargraves from The Perils of Pauline movie serial (1933)
 Phryne Fisher from Miss Fisher and the Crypt of Tears (2020) 
 Qi'ra from Solo: A Star Wars Story (2018)
 Quorra from Tron: Legacy (2010)
 Rey from Star Wars sequel trilogy (2015–2019)
 Rosie Carver in Live and Let Die (1973)
 Riley North from Peppermint (2018)
 Sarah Bailey from The Craft (1996)
 Sarah Connor from the Terminator series (1984–2015)
 Saki Asamiya from Sukeban Deka
 Saya from Blood: The Last Vampire (2009 film)
 Selene from the Underworld series (2003–2016)
 Sgt. Rita Rose Vrataski from Edge of Tomorrow (2014)
 Tank Girl/Rebecca from Tank Girl (film) (1995)
 Tiger Woman from The Tiger Woman (1944 film) (1944)
 Tong Li from Operation Red Sea (2018)
 Torchy Blane from the Torchy Blane series (1937–1939)
 Trinity from The Matrix series (1999–2021)
 Trudy Chacón from Avatar (2009)
 Wanda Maximoff (Scarlet Witch)  from Marvel Cinematic Universe
 Yōko Godai from Sukeban Deka The Movie
 Yu Shu Lien from Crouching Tiger, Hidden Dragon (2000)
 Yuki Kashima from Lady Snowblood (1973) and Lady Snowblood 2: Love Song of Vengeance (1974)
 Yui Kazama from Sukeban Deka the Movie 2: Counter-Attack from the Kazama Sisters
 Zen from Chocolate (2008)
 Zoë Bell from Grindhouse (2007)
 The females ghostbusters from Ghostbusters (2016 film)
 The granddaughter of Egon and youngs females from Ghostbusters: Afterlife
 The protagonist female of The Princess (2022 action film)

Films based on comic books

 Alice Monaghan from Hellboy (2019)
 Alita from Alita: Battle Angel (2019)
 Judge Anderson from Dredd (2012)
 Knives Chau from Scott Pilgrim vs. the World (2010)
 Liz Sherman from Hellboy (2004)
 Ramona Flowers from Scott Pilgrim vs. the World (2010)
 Hit-Girl from Kick-Ass (2010)
 Silk Spectre from Watchmen (2009)
 Tank Girl from Tank Girl (1995)

DC

 Amazons from Wonder Woman (2017 film) and the DC Extended Universe
 Antiope from Wonder Woman (2017 film) and the DC Extended Universe
 Batgirl from Batman and Robin (1997)
 Catwoman from Batman Returns (1992), Catwoman (2004), The Dark Knight Rises (2012) and The Batman (2022)
 Faora from Man of Steel (film)
 Queen Hippolyta  from Wonder Woman (2017 film) and the DC Extended Universe
 Mera from Aquaman (2018)
 Kara Zor-El from Supergirl (1984)

Marvel

Angel Dust from Deadpool (2016)
Angel Salvadore from X-Men: First Class (2011)
Carol Danvers (Captain Marvel) from Marvel Cinematic Universe
Elektra from Daredevil (2003) and Elektra (2005)
Emma Frost  from  X-Men: First Class (2011)
Gamora from Marvel Cinematic Universe
GoGo Tomago from Big Hero 6 (2014)
Hela from Thor: Ragnarok (2017)
Honey Lemon from Big Hero 6 (2014)
Hope van Dyne (Wasp) from Marvel Cinematic Universe
Invisible Woman/Sue Storm from Fantastic Four (2005), Fantastic Four: Rise of the Silver Surfer (2007) and Fantastic Four (2015)
Jane Foster (Mighty Thor) from Marvel Cinematic Universe
Jean Grey (Phoenix) from the X-Men films
Jubilation Lee (Jubilee) from the X-Men films	
Kitty Pryde  from the X-Men films
Lady Deathstrike from X2 (2003)
Mantis from Marvel Cinematic Universe
Maria Hill from Marvel Cinematic Universe
Mystique/Raven from the X-Men films
Natasha Romanoff (Black Widow) from Marvel Cinematic Universe
Nebula from Marvel Cinematic Universe
Peggy Carter from Marvel Cinematic Universe
Red Sonja from Red Sonja (film) (1985)
Rogue from the X-Men films
Sharon Carter from Marvel Cinematic Universe
Sif from Marvel Cinematic Universe
Storm from the X-Men films 
Wanda Maximoff (Scarlet Witch) from Marvel Cinematic Universe
Valkyrie from Marvel Cinematic Universe
Viper from The Wolverine (2013)
Shuri, Okoye, and Nakia from Marvel Cinematic Universe
Yelena Belova (Black Widow) from Marvel Cinematic Universe

Films based on novels

 Beatrice "Tris" Prior from Divergent Series
 Éowyn from The Lord of the Rings series (2001-2003)
 Katniss Everdeen from The Hunger Games (2012–2015)
 Florence Zimmerman from The House with a Clock in Its Walls (2018)
 Hermione Granger from Harry Potter series (2001-2011)
 Hester Shaw from Mortal Engines (2018)
 Nurse Ratched from One Flew Over the Cuckoo's Nest (1975)

Films based on video games

 Alice from the Resident Evil series (2002–2016)
 Cammy from Street Fighter (1994)
 Chun-Li from Street Fighter and Street Fighter: The Legend of Chun-Li (2009)
 Claire Redfield from the Resident Evil series (2012)
 Jill Valentine from the Resident Evil series (2004–2012)
 Kitana and Sonya Blade from Mortal Kombat (1995) and Mortal Kombat: Annihilation (1997)
 Lara Croft from Lara Croft: Tomb Raider (2001), Lara Croft: Tomb Raider – The Cradle of Life (2003) and Tomb Raider (2018)
 Rose Da Silva from Silent Hill (2006)
 Aki Ross and Jane Proudfoot from Final Fantasy: The Spirits Within
 Tifa Lockhart from Final Fantasy VII: Advent Children
 Tamina from Prince of Persia: The Sands of Time (film)
 All females in Resident Evil: Welcome to Raccoon City

Literature

 Alanna of Trebond from The Song of the Lioness series (1983-1988) by Tamora Pierce
 Alyx from The Adventures of Alyx stories by Joanna Russ (1967-1970)
 Annabeth Chase of the Percy Jackson & the Olympians series.
 Arya Stark from the A Song of Ice and Fire series (1996-2011) by George R.R. Martin
 Beatrice "Tris" Prior from the Divergent trilogy (2011-2013) by Veronica Roth
 Camilla from the Aeneid (29-19 BCE) by Virgil
 Cassie Sullivan from The 5th Wave novel series and film based on the series.
 Catti-brie from the Forgotten Realms novels by R. A. Salvatore
 Daenerys Targaryen from the A Song of Ice and Fire series (1996-2011) by George R.R. Martin
 Emma Castairs and Cristina Rosales from The Dark Artifices series (2016-2018) by Cassandra Clare
 Éowyn from The Lord of the Rings series (1954-1955) by J. R. R. Tolkien
 Gum Girl, Ninja-Rina, and Brainstormer from The Gumazing Gum Girl! series (2013–present) by Rhode Montijo.
 Hermione Granger and Ginny Weasley from the Harry Potter series (1997-2007) by J.K Rowling 
 Jael from The Female Man by Joanna Russ (1970)
 Katniss Everdeen and Johanna Mason from The Hunger Games trilogy (2008-2010) by Suzanne Collins
 Modesty Blaise from Peter O'Donnell's comic strip (1963-2001) and book series (1965-1996)
 Linh Cinder from The Lunar Chronicles series (2012-2015) by Marissa Meyer
 Mara Jade from Star Wars Legends (1991-2012)
 Molly Millions from Johnny Mnemonic (1981) and Neuromancer (1984) by William Gibson
 Nancy Drew from the Nancy Drew Mystery Stories (1930-2004), The Nancy Drew Files (1986-1997) and the Girl Detective (2004-2012) series by Carolyn Keene
 Pippi Longstocking from the Pippi Longstocking series (1945-2001) by Astrid Lindgren
 Polgara from The Belgariad (1982-1984) and The Malloreon (1987-1991) series by David and Leigh Eddings
 Suzy Shooter from the Nightside series (2003-2012) by Simon R. Green
 Visenya Targaryen from the A Song of Ice and Fire series (1996-2011) by George R.R. Martin
Isabelle Lightwood and Clary Fray from The Mortal Instruments series (2007-2014) by Cassandra Clare
Tessa Gray, Cecily Herondale and Charlotte Branwell from The Infernal Devices by Cassandra Clare
Holly Short and Juliet Butler of the Artemis Fowl series (2001-2012) by Eoin Colfer

Literary villains
Grendel's mother from the anonymous Old English poem Beowulf
 The Others from The 5th Wave and film based on the novel: Nickname given by Cassie Sullivan. Extraterrestrial series that devastate humanity and mankind by unleashing a series of waves to kill them. They are sometimes known Silencers.

Television

 Ace from Doctor Who (1963–1989)
 Aeryn Sun from Farscape (1999–2003)
 Alex Danvers  from Supergirl (2015–present)
 Alex Mack from The Secret World of Alex Mack (1994–1998)
 Andrea Thomas from The Secrets of Isis
 Angelique Bouchard from Dark Shadows (1966-1971)
 Arya Stark from Game of Thrones (2011–2019)
 B'Elanna Torres from Star Trek: Voyager (1995–2001)
 Batgirl from Batman (1966–1968)
 Brienne of Tarth from Game of Thrones (2011–2019)
 Brooke Davis from One Tree Hill (2003–2012)
 Buffy Summers from Buffy the Vampire Slayer (1997–2003)
 Cameron from Terminator: The Sarah Connor Chronicles (2008–2009)
 Capt. Maggie Beckett from Sliders (1995–2000)
 Cathy Gale from The Avengers (1961–1969)
 Christine Cagney from Cagney & Lacey (1982–1988)
 Christy Love from Get Christy Love! (1974–1975)
 Claire Bennet from Heroes (2006–2010)
 Clarke Griffin from The 100 (2014–2020)
 Cordelia Chase from Angel (1999–2004)
 Daenerys Targaryen from Game of Thrones (2011–2019)
 Daisy Johnson (Quake) from Agents of S.H.I.E.L.D. (2013–2020)
 Dana Scully from The X-Files (1993–2002)
 Deirdre from Mystic Knights of Tir Na Nog
 Doña María Teresa "Tessa" Alvarado from Queen of Swords (2000–2001)
 Donna Noble from Doctor Who
 Elektra Natchios from Daredevil (2015–2018) and The Defenders (2017)
 Electra Woman and Dyna Girl
 Emma Peel from The Avengers (1961–1969)
 Emma Swan from Once Upon a Time
 Erin Lindsay from Chicago P.D. (2014–2017)
 Fiona Gallagher from Shameless (2011–present)
 Gabby Dawson Casey from Chicago Fire (2012–present)
 Gabrielle from Xena: Warrior Princess (1995–2001) and Hercules: The Legendary Journeys (1995-1999)
 Gwen Cooper from Torchwood (2006–2011)
Gauri/Devi/Durga from Maharakshak: Devi (2015)
 Haley James-Scott from  One Tree Hill (2003–2012)
 Honey West from Honey West 
 Jane Hopper/Eleven from Stranger Things (2016–present)
 Joyce Byers from Stranger Things
 Jadzia Dax from Star Trek: Deep Space Nine (1993–1999)
 Julia Martinez (Manila) from Money Heist
 Jaime Sommers from The Bionic Woman (1976–1978) and Bionic Woman (2007)
 Jane Doe from Blindspot (TV series) (2015-2020)
 Caporal Jennifer "Pilot" Chase from Captain Power and the soldiers of the future
 Jessica Jones from Jessica Jones (2015–2019)
 Jill Munroe from Charlie's Angels (1976–1981)
 Julie Barnes in The Mod Squad
 Julie Rogers from Charlie's Angels (1976–1981)
 Kara Danvers (Supergirl) from Supergirl (2015–present)
 Kate Austen from Lost (2004–2010)
 Kate Kane (Batwoman) from Batwoman (2019–Present)
 Kathryn Janeway from Star Trek: Voyager (1995–2001)
 Kelly Garrett from Charlie's Angels (1976–1981)
 Kimberly Hart (The Pink Ranger) from Mighty Morphin Power Rangers (1993–1995)
 Kira Nerys from Star Trek: Deep Space Nine (1993–1999)
 Kris Munroe from Charlie's Angels (1976–1981)
 Laurel Lance (Black Siren/Black Canary) from Arrowverse (2012–present)
 Lagertha from Vikings (2013 TV series) (2013-2020)
 Leela from Doctor Who (1963–1989)
 Mónica Gaztambide (Stockholm) from Money Heist
 Maggie Beckett from Sliders
 Mary Beth Lacey from Cagney & Lacey (1982–1988)
 Max Guevera from Dark Angel (2000–2002)
 Martha Jones from Doctor Who 
 Melinda May from Agents of S.H.I.E.L.D. (2013–2020)
 Michonne from The Walking Dead (TV series)
 Nikita from La Femme Nikita (1997–2001)
 Nairobi from Money Heist
 Nyota Uhura from Star Trek (1966–present)
 Nancy Wheeler from Stranger Things
 Olivia Benson from Law & Order: Special Victims Unit (1999–present)
 Olivia Dunham from Fringe (2008–2013)
 Paige Matthews from Charmed (2001–2006)
 Peggy Carter (Agent Carter) from Agent Carter (2015–2016)
 Peyton Sawyer from One Tree Hill (2003–2012)
 Phoebe Halliwell from Charmed (1998–2006)
 Phryne Fisher from Miss Fisher's Murder Mysteries (2012-2015) 
 Piper Halliwell from Charmed (1998–2006)
 Prue Halliwell from Charmed (1998–2001)
 Purdey from The New Avengers (1976–1977)
 Raquel Murillo from Money Heist
 River Song from Doctor Who (1963–1989)
 River Tam from Firefly (2002)
Rose Tyler  from Doctor Who 
 Sabrina Duncan from Charlie's Angels (1976–1981)
 Saki Asamiya, Yoko Godai, Kyoko "Okyo" Nakamura, Yukino Yajima, Yui Kazama, Yuka and Yuma from Sukeban Deka
 Samantha Carter from the Stargate franchise
 Sara Lance/The Canary/White Canary from Arrow and Legends of Tomorrow
 Sarah MacKenzie from JAG
 Sarah Jane Smith from Doctor Who and The Sarah Jane Adventures
 Seska from Star Trek: Voyager
 Seven of Nine from Star Trek: Voyager (1995–2001)
 Tokyo From Money Heist
 Shelby Woo from The Mystery Files of Shelby Woo (1996–1998)
 Sylvie Brett from Chicago Fire (2012–present)
 Starbuck from Battlestar Galactica (2004–2009)
 Sydney Bristow from Alias (2001–2006)
 Tara King from The Avengers (1961–1969)
 Tasha Yar from Star Trek: The Next Generation
 The Doctor (thirteenth incarnation) from Doctor Who (2005–present)
 Tiffany Welles from Charlie's Angels (1976–1981)
 Trini Kwan from Mighty Morphin Power Rangers (1993–1995)
 Vallery Irons from V.I.P. (1998–2002)
 Veronica Layton from The Lost World (1999–2002)
 Veronica Mars from Veronica Mars (2004–2007)
 Wade Welles from Sliders (1995–2000)
 Wonder Woman from Wonder Woman (1975–1979)
 Xena from Xena: Warrior Princess (1995–2001) and Hercules: The Legendary Journeys (1995–1999)
 Ygritte from Game of Thrones (2011–2017)
 Zoe Washburne from Firefly (2002)
 Maggie Greene, Carol Peletier, Rosita Espinosa, Magna, Yumiko and Connie from The Walking Dead (TV series)
 Aisha Campbell from "Mighty Morphin Power Rangers"
 Delphine from "Mighty Morphin Alien Rangers"
 Kat Hillard from "Mighty Morphin Power Rangers", "Power Rangers Zeo" and "Power Rangers Turbo"
 Tanya Sloan from "Power Rangers Zeo" and "Power Rangers Turbo"
 Ashley Hammond and Cassie Chan from "Power Rangers Turbo" and "Power Rangers in Space"
 Maya, Kendrix and Karone from "Power Rangers Lost Galaxy"
 Kelsey Winslow and Dana Mitchell from "Power Rangers Lightspeed Rescue"
 Katie Walker and Jennifer "Jen" Scotts from "Power Rangers Time Force"
 Taylor Earhardt and Alyssa Enrilé from "Power Rangers Wild Force"
 Tori Hanson from "Power Rangers Ninja Storm"
 Kira Ford from "Power Rangers Dino Thunder"
 Elizabeth "Z" Delgado and Sydney "Syd" Drew from "Power Rangers S.P.D."
 Angie Diaz as Vida "V" Rocca, Udonna and Madison "Maddie" Rocca from "Power Rangers Mystic Force"
 Veronica "Ronny" Robinson and Rose Ortiz from "Power Rangers Operation Overdrive"
 Lily Chilman and Master Guin from "Power Rangers Jungle Fury"
 Summer Landsdown and Gemma from "Power Rangers RPM"
 Emily Stewart, Lauren Shiba and Mia Watanabe from "Power Rangers Samurai" and "Power Rangers Super Samurai"
 Emma Goodall and Gia Moran from "Power Rangers Megaforce" and "Power Rangers Super Megaforce"	
 Shelby Watkins and Kendall Morgan from "Power Rangers Dino Charge" and "Power Rangers Dino Super Charge"
 Hayley Foster and Sarah Thompson from "Power Rangers Ninja Steel" and "Power Rangers Super Ninja Steel"
 Zoey Reeves from "Power Rangers Beast Morphers"
 Sabrina Spellman from "Sabrina, the Teenage Witch"
 Amelia Jones and Izzy Garcia in Power Rangers Dino Fury
 Peggy Matsuyama from Himitsu Sentai Gorenger

Animated television series
See also: female action heroes and villains in the section for anime.

 Æon Flux from Æon Flux (1991–1995)
 Agent L from Men in Black: The Series
 Alex from Totally Spies! (2001–2014)
 Alice from Superjail
 Betty Barrett (Atomic Betty) from Atomic Betty (2004–2008)
 Ashi from Samurai Jack (2017)
 Amalia and Evangelyne from Wakfu
 Blossom, Bubbles and Buttercup from The Powerpuff Girls (1998–2005)
 The Guardians from W.I.T.C.H.
 The Winx from Winx Club
 Clover from Totally Spies! (2001–2014)
 Cybersix from Cybersix (1999)
 Fleur d'épine from Cartouche
 Jenny Wakeman/XJ9 from My Life as a Teenage Robot (2003–2005, 2007–2009)
 Mami Sakura from Esper Mami (1987–1989)
 Cheetara from ThunderCats (1985–1989)
 Jane from Jane and the Dragon (TV series)
 Jessica Morgan from The Transformers (TV series) (1984-1987)
 Katara from Avatar: The Last Airbender (2005–2008)
 Kim Possible from Kim Possible (2002–2007)
 Korra from The Legend of Korra (2012–2014)
 Leela from Futurama (1999–2003, 2008–2013)
 Marissa Faireborn from The Transformers (TV series) (1984-1987)
 Millie from Helluva Boss
 Sam from Totally Spies! (2001–2014)
 Sari Sumdac from Transformers: Animated (2007-2009)
 She-Ra from She-Ra: Princess of Power (1985–1987)
 Sophia Paramount from Bob Morane (1998 TV series)
 The Gems from Steven Universe
 The princesses from LoliRock
 Yumi and Aelita from Code Lyoko
 Ladybug, Alya, Chloé Bourgeois and any young female with kwamis from Miraculous: Tales of Ladybug & Cat Noir
 Calamity Jane from The Legend of Calamity Jane
 April O'Neil from Teenage Mutant Ninja Turtles
 Jennifer Julian and Rebecca Wong from Chris Colorado
 The females from Alienators: Evolution Continues
 Penny from Inspector Gadget and Gadget and the Gadgetinis
 Luea from Kong: The Animated Series 
 The twins sisters from Mary-Kate and Ashley in Action!
 Calamity Jane from Lucky Luke
 Cyana Baarha from Malo Korrigan
 Stacey Bonner and Seattle Montoya from Stargate Infinity
 Giga-Woman from Captain Biceps 
 Megan from SpieZ! Nouvelle Génération / The Amazing Spiez!
 Dale Arden and Thundar from Flash Gordon
 Miss Lestrade from Sherlock Holmes in the 22nd Century
 Sixe from Tripping the Rift
 Marianne Flambelle from Marianne 1ère
 Mia and her female friends from Mia and Me
 Niko from Adventures of the Galaxy Rangers
 Juge J.B. McBride from Bravestarr
 Kylie from Extreme Ghostbusters
 Steelheart from SilverHawks
 Jedda from Defenders Of The Earth
 Futura from Ghostbusters (1986 TV series)
 Helen Bennett and Meg Bennett from Bionic Six
 Katerina Anastasia from Spiral Zone
 Galadria from Visionaries: Knights of the Magical Light
 Females policeman from COPS (animated TV series)
 Females Cops from Police Academy
 Patty Putty and Terri Cloth from Garbage Pail Kids
 Princess Lana from Captain N
 Any female commando from GI JOE
 Lydia from Beetlejuice
 2 females from Captain Planet and the Planeteers
 2 females from James Bond Jr
 Hannah Dundee from Cadillacs and Dinosaurs
 Elisa Maza, Angela and Demona from Gargoyles (TV series)
 a female from Johnny Quest
 Eva Kant from Diabolik
 Nancy from RoboCop: Alpha Commando
 Lewis from Robocop: The Animated Series
 Jade Chan from Jackie Chan Adventures
 Princess Bubblegum and Marceline Abadeer from Adventure time
 Raf, Uri and Miki from Angel's Friends
 Zhalia Moon and Sophie Casterwill from Huntik: Secrets & Seekers
 Arkayna Goodfey, Emerald Goldenbraid, Zarya Moonwolf and Piper Willowbrook from Mysticons
 Twinkle Starglitter and Ruby from Super 4 (TV series)
 The ghouls and female from the longs movies of "Monster High"
 The girls from "Lego Friends" in "Friends: Girls on a Mission"
 Emily Jones and female elves from "Lego Elves"
 Princess Sélénia from "Arthur and the Invisibles"
 Alexis from "Transformers Armada"
 Lori Jiménez from "Transformers: Cybertron"
 Misha Miramond from "Transformers: Energon"
 Miko Nakadai from "Transformers: Prime"
 Dani Burns and Francine "Frankie" Elma Greene from "Transformers: Rescue Bots"
 Kylie Griffin from "Extreme Ghostbusters"
 Janine Melnitz and Catherine (one of the Junior Ghostbusters) from "The Real Ghostbusters"
 Jedda Walker from "Defenders of the Earth"
 Dale Arden and Thundar from "Flash Gordon"
 April O'Neil from "Teenage Mutant Ninja Turtles (2003 TV series)", "Teenage Mutant Ninja Turtles (2012 TV series)", "Rise of the Teenage Mutant Ninja Turtles"
 Sagan Cruz from "Phantom 2040"
 Princess Unikitty, Dr. Fox, Master Doom and Flamurtle from Unikitty!
 Nova and Jinmay from Super Robot Monkey Team Hyperforce Go!
 Princess Twilight Sparkle, Rarity, Rainbow Dash, Fluttershy, Applejack and Pinkie Pie from My Little Pony: Friendship is Magic
 Webby Vanderquck, Della Duck, Mrs. Beakley, Penumbra, Daisy Duck and Gosalyn Waddlemeyer from "DuckTales (2017 TV series)"
 Star Butterfly, Moon Butterfly, Eclipsa Butterfly, Meteora Butterfly, most previous Butterfly family members, Mina Loveberry, Hekapoo, Janna Ordonia and Pony Head from Star vs. the Forces of Evil
 Anne Boonchuy, Polly Plantar, Sasha Waybright, Marcy Wu, Ivy Sundew, General Yunan and Lady Olivia from Amphibia
 Luz Noceda from The Owl House
 Numbuh 3/Kuki Sanbun and Numbuh 5/Abigail Lincoln from Codename: Kids Next Door
 Felicity from  Rainbow Butterfly Unicorn Kitty
 Miko Kubota from Glitch Techs
 Kipo Oak and Wolf from Kipo and the Age of Wonderbeasts
 Mabel Pines and Wendy Courdroy from Gravity Falls
 Reggie Abbott and Esther from Twelve Forever
 Sylvia and Lord Dominator from Wander Over Yonder
 Adorabat from Mao Mao: Heroes of Pure Heart
 Tara Duncan and the female friends from Tara Duncan
 Millie and Loona from Helluva Boss
 BG/Gudule from Miss BG
 Nellie Bly from The Historical Figures Show
 Yadina Riddle from Xavier Riddle and the Secret Museum
 Brendar from The Barbarian and the Troll
 Ivy from Where on Earth Is Carmen Sandiego?
 Carmen Sandiego from Carmen Sandiego (TV series)

Anime

 Antoinette "Tony" Dubois from Reporter Blues
 Princess Sapphire from Princess Knight by Osamu Tetsuka
 Princess Hime, Liliane, Lisa Wildman and Reiri Kamura from Princess Resurrection
 Simone from La Seine no Hoshi
 Ruby Rose, Weiss Schnee, Yang Xiao Long, Blake Belladonna from RWBY
 Angie Islington from Angie Girl
 Lady Armaroid from Cobra
 Marina from Galaxy Express 999
 Lalabel from Lalabel
 Megu-Chan (Little Meg the Witch Girl) from Majokko Megu-chan
 Ymir Fritz and her daughters Maria, Rose, and Sina from Attack on Titan
 Clare and other sliver hair Claymorer/Witch from Claymore
 Hoshimi from Maps
 Maka Albarn from Soul Eater
 Mako Sato and Sayuki from Initial D
 Mikura Suzuki from Mezzo Forte and Mezzo DSA
 Noa Izumi from Patlabor
 Rushuna from Grenadier
 Sawa from Kite
 Thief girl from Cat's Eye
 Karri, Miki and Seiko from City Hunter
 Tiko and Tickle from Majokko Tickle
 Patty Lowell from Devil May Cry: The Animated Series
 Asuna Yuuki from Sword Art Online
 Mikasa Ackerman from Attack on Titan
 Erza Scarlet, Lucy Heartfilia and Wendy from Fairy Tail
 Homura Akemi from Puella Magi Madoka Magica
 Nevenaa and Ariane Goliatkine (power to become big age) from Anatane: Saving the Children of Okura
 Android 18 and Videl from Dragon Ball Z
 Pan from Dragon Ball GT
 Ran Tsukikage from Kazemakase Tsukikage Ran (Carried by the Wind: Tsukikage Ran)
 Yoruichi Shihouin from Bleach
 Hikaru Minamoto from Otogi Zoshi (TV series) (Otogi Zoshi: The Legend of Magatama)
 Oscar François de Jarjayes from The Rose of Versailles
 Satsuki Kiryuuin From Kill la Kill
 Lina Inverse, Ameila, Sylphiel, and Naga from Slayers
 Sara and Fuu from Samurai Champloo
 Utena Tenjou from Shoujo Kakumei Utena (Revolutionary Girl Utena)
 Shana From Shakugan no Shana
 Shiki Ryougi From Kara no Kyoukai (The Garden of Sinners)
 Kagome Higurashi and Sango From InuYasha
 Princess Lum from Urusei Yatsura
 Lunlun from Hana no Ko Lunlun
 Youko Nakajima From The Twelve Kingdoms
 Emu Hino from Crying Freeman
 Eira from Ellcia
 Makie Otono-Tachibana From Blade of the Immortal
 Morgiana From Magi: The Labyrinth of Magic
 Balsa Yonsa From Seirei no Moribito (Moribito - Guardian of the Spirit)
 Fujiko Mine from Lupin the Third
 Mamiya from Hokuto No Ken
 Miyu from Vampire Princess Miyu
 Otonashi Saya from Blood+
 Saya Kisaragi from Blood-C
 Rally and Minnie from Gunsmith Cats
 Rei Ayanami and Asuka Langley Soryu from Neon Genesis Evangelion
 Deedlit from Record of Lodoss War
 Amaha Masane, Korean ethnic bearer of the blade from Witchblade
 Faye Valentine from Cowboy Bebop
 Sakura from Card Captor Sakura and Tsubasa Reservoir Chronicle
 Excel from Excel Saga
 Nami and Nico Robin from One Piece
 Naru Narusegawa, Motoko Aoyama and Kaolla Sû from Love Hina
 Victoria Séras and Integra Fairbrook Wingates Hellsing from Hellsing
 Mahoro Andô from Mahoromatic
 Françoise / 003 from Cyborg 009
 Robin Sena from Witch Hunter Robin
 The Mew Mew from Mew Mew Power
 Sakura Haruno, Hinata Hyuga, and Ino Yamanaka from Naruto
 The female child from Gunslinger Girl
 Maya Natsume and Aya Natsume from Tenjô Tenge
 The warriors female from Tales of Phantasia: The Animations
 Maam and Leona from Dragon Quest: The Adventure of Dai
 Ai from Hell Girl
 Illyasviel von Einzbern and Rider from Fate/stay night
 Kyohei Tachibana and Sei from Burst Angel
 Laureline from Valérian and Laureline
 Michiru Kita from Zombie Loan
 Yûmi from Pastel Yumi, the Magic Idol
 Hikaru Shidou, Umi Ryuzaki, and Fuu Hououji from Magic Knight Rayearth
 Mireille Bouquet and Kirika Yuumura from Noir
 Momo from Magical Princess Minky Momo
 Motoko Kusanagi from Ghost in the Shell: Stand Alone Complex (2002–2005) and Ghost in the Shell: Arise - Alternative Architecture (2015)
 Naomi Armitage from Armitage III
 Nella from Nella the Princess Knight
 Pollon from Little Pollon
 Ranma (female form) and the other girls from Ranma ½
 Sally from Sally the Witch
 Athena and Saintia from Saint Seiya and Saint Seiya: Saintia Sho
 Sailor Moon and other Sailor Scouts from the Sailor Moon franchise.
 Princess Flora from Honey Honey no Suteki na Bouken
 Françoise / Fantômette from Fantômette
 Honey Kisaragi from Cutie Honey
 Myung Fang Lone from Macross Plus
 Natsuru Senō (female), Akane Mishima, Shizuku Sangō, Mikoto Kondō and Kaede Sakura from Kämpfer
 The littles girls from Ojamajo Doremi
 Yufa from Ragnarok the Animation
 Warrior women half human half demons from Claymore
 The school girls from Magical Girl Site
 Celty Sturluson from Durarara!!
 Revy, Balalaïka, Eda, Roberta et Fabiola Iglesias from Black Lagoon
 Meia, Barnette, Jura, "BC", and Dita from Vandread
 Rose Cinderella and the other littles daughter of fairy tales from Regal Academy
 The girls from W.I.T.C.H.
 Renka from Ironfist Chinmi
 Arusu, Sheila and Eva from Tweeny Witches
 Lucy Heartfilia, Erza Scarlet, Wendy Marvel, Carla, Mirajane Strauss and Juvia Loxar from Fairy Tail
 Tuka Luna Marceau, Lelei la Lalena, Rory Mercury, Yao Haa Dushi, Mari Kurokawa, Shino Kuribayashi and others female warriors from Gate
 Ryuko Matoi and Satsuki Kiryuin from Kill La Kill
 the females from Sound of the Sky
 Izetta from Izetta: The Last Witch
 The girls from High School Fleet
 Tanya from Saga of Tanya the Evil
 The 2 girls of Girls' Last Tour
 the female of Kantai Collection
 the girls tank driver in Girls und Panzer
 The zombies girls in Calamity of a Zombie Girl
 Iu Shindo in I'm Standing on a Million Lives
 Noel and Ninny in Burn the Witch
 Elaina in Wandering Witch: The Journey of Elaina
 The witches girls from Little Witch Academia
 The girl from Witch Craft Works
 The girls from Zero No Tsukaima
 the girls from Strike Witches
 the bloody female from Umineko - When They Cry
 the girl in Sugar Sugar Rune
 the girls in Soul Eater Not!
 the girls in Strike Witches 2
 the witch girl in Rental Magica
 the girls in Assassination Classroom
 the girl in Majokko Megu-chan
 the girls in Angelic Layer
 the female with umbrella in Beelzebub
 the archers girls in Utawareru mono
 the girl in Nijû-Mensô no Musume
 the android female and other female in Space Cobra
 any woman in Code Geass
 any female in Coyote Ragtime Show
 the elves female in Legend of Crystania
 the girl in DNA²
 any girls in E's Otherwise
 the girls in El Cazador de la Bruja
 the girls in El Hazard
 the girls in Elemental Gerad
 the females in Final Fantasy: Unlimited
 the girls in Gate Keepers
 the females in GetBackers
 the girl in Sakura Wars TV
 the girl in Guilty Crown
 the girls in High School Samurai
 Lynn in Hokuto No Ken 2
 Marie in Hungry Marie
 the girls in Ikkitousen
 the girls in Interlude
 Girl with bow in Inuyasha
 girl in Kiba
 the girls in Labyrinth of Flames
 the girls in Aquarian Age - Sign for Evolution
 the girls samurai in Shura no Toki
 the alien girl in Urusei Yatsura
 the 3 girls in Magic Knight Rayearth
 Madoka Ayukawa in Kimagure Orange Road
 the girls in Sound of the Sky
 the girl in Mezzo Danger Service Agency
 the girls in Mirai Nikki
 the girls in Moeyo Ken
 the girl in Murder Princess
 the females from Fushigi no umi no Nadia
 the females from Mahō sensei Negima!
 the females from Overman King Gainer
 the females from Pandora Hearts
 the android female from Parasite Dolls
 the girls in Rave Master
 the girls in Red Eyes Sword
 the female in Samurai Gun
 the lady in Shadow Skill
 the girl in Shangri-La
 the girls in Shining Tears X Wind
 the girls in Soul Eater
 the witch girl in The Good Witch of the West
 the girl in The Garden of Sinners
 the girls in Tiger & Bunny
 the girls in Tokyo Demon Campus
 Sakura in Tsubasa Chronicle and Cardcaptor Sakura
 the vampires girls in Shingetsutan Tsukihime
 the 2 girls in Shōjo kakumei Utena
 the girl in Vampire Knight
 Aoi Yume in Wing-Man
 the females in X1999
 the lady in XxxHOLiC
 the girl in Zakuro
 ladies in Queen's Blade
 Aoi Yume in Wing-Man
 The girls from Tsukihime
 The girls from Oh My Goddess!
 The girl from Angie Girl
 Lillabit  from The Littl' Bits
 The females from Captain Harlock
 Charmy and Mereoleona Vermillion from Black Clover
 Nami, Princess Vivi and Nico Robin from One Piece
 Milim Nava from That Time I Got Reincarnated as a Slime
 The females from Michiko & Hatchin
 Uraraka Ochaco from My Hero Academia
 Shinobu Kocho, Nezuko Kamado from Demon Slayer
 Sasha Braus, Mikasa Ackerman from Attack on Titan
 Orihime Inoue from "Bleach"
 Pitou , Pakunoda from Hunter X Hunter
 Konan and Hinata Hyuga from Naruto
 The females from Black Lagoon

Commercials
 Nameless runner (Anya Major) in Ridley Scott's 1984 (advertisement)

Video games

 Ada Wong, Claire Redfield, Jill Valentine, Rebecca Chambers, Sheva Alomar, Sherry Birkin (only RE6), Helena Harper, and Mia Winters, from Resident Evil series
 Aegis from Persona 3
 Alisa Bosconovitch, Anna Williams, Asuka Kazama, Christie Monteiro, Lucky Chloe, Jun Kazama, Michelle Chang, Nina Williams, Julia Chang and Ling Xiaoyu from Tekken series
 Alma Wade from F.E.A.R.
 Aloy from Horizon Zero Dawn
 Alyx Vance from Half-Life 2 and its sequels
 Amaterasu from Ōkami
 Amélie Lacroix (Widowmaker), Brigitte Lindholm, Moira O'Deorain and Mercy from Overwatch; Aleksandra Zaryanova (Zarya), Ana Amari, Lena Oxton (Tracer), Hana Song (D.Va), and Mei-Ling Zhou from Overwatch and Heroes of the Storm
 Anna DeWitt from BioShock Infinite
 Annah-of-the-Shadows from Planescape: Torment
 April Ryan from The Longest Journey
 Athena Asamiya from Psycho Soldier and Athena: Awakening from the Ordinary Life
 Aveline de Grandpré from Assassin's Creed III: Liberation., Evie Frye from Assassin's Creed Syndicate, Jun from Assassin's Creed Chronicles and Elise from Assassin's Creed Unity
 Ayame from Tenchu series
 Bastila Shan from Star Wars: Knights of the Old Republic
 Bayonetta from Bayonetta
 Jess et Soph Blazkowicz from Wolfenstein: Youngblood
 Blaze Fielding from Streets of Rage
 Blue Mary and Mai Shiranui from Fatal Fury
 Brianna Kae from Star Wars Knights of the Old Republic II: The Sith Lords
 Cammy White, C. Viper, Chun-Li, Kolin, Laura Matsuda, Lucia Morgan, Menat, Makoto, Maki Genryusai, Ibuki, Rainbow Mika, Sakura Kasugano, and Rose from Final Fight & Street Fighter series
 Carmen Isabella Sandiego from Where in the World Is Carmen Sandiego?
 Cassie Cage, Jade, Mileena, Princess Kitana, Queen Sindel, Skarlet, Sonya Blade and Tanya from Mortal Kombat series
 Cate Archer from The Operative: No One Lives Forever
 Taina "Caveira" Pereira and Yumiko "Hibana" Imagawa from Rainbow Six Siege
 Chell and GLaDOS from Portal and Portal 2
 Cindy Aurum, Dagger, Edea Kramer, Faris Scherwiz, Lightning, Rikku, Rydia, Terra Branford, Yuffie Kisaragi and Yuna from Final Fantasy series
 Commander Shepard from Mass Effect 3
 Dark Queen from Battletoads
 Elara Dorne from Star Wars: The Old Republic
 Elena Fisher and Chloe Frazer from Uncharted
 Elexis Sinclaire from SiN
 Ellie from The Last of Us and The Last of Us: Left Behind
 Emily Kaldwin from Dishonored 2
 Etna from Disgaea
 Faith Connors from Mirror's Edge
 Filia Medici from Skullgirls
 Felicia, Morrigan Aensland, Hsien-Ko and Mei-Ling, Baby Bonnie Hood and Q-Bee from Darkstalkers series
 Hana Tsu-Vachel from Fear Effect
 Heather Mason and Claudia Wolf from Silent Hill 3 and Dahlia Gillespie from Silent Hill 1
 Jade from Beyond Good & Evil
 Jaina Proudmoore, Sylvanas Windrunner and Tyrande Whisperwind from Warcraft series and Heroes of the Storm
 Joanna Dark from Perfect Dark
 Kasumi, Christie, Helena Douglas, Hitomi, Tina Armstrong, Ayane from Dead or Alive
 Mona Sax from Max Payne
 Kiana, Mei, Theresa, Bronya, Himeko, Fu Hua, Seele, Yae Sakura, Rita, and Durandal from Honkai Impact 3rd
 Lara Croft from the Tomb Raider series
 Lucia of Badham from The Wing of Madoola
 Lucca, Marle, and Ayla from Chrono Trigger
 Millia Rage, May, Ramlethal Valentine and I-No from Guilty Gear series
 Momiji and Rachel from Ninja Gaiden
 Mona Sax from Max Payne
 Nakoruru from Samurai Shodown
 Arle Nadja from Madō Monogatari and Puyo Puyo
 Nilin Cartier-Wells from Remember Me
 Nova Terra and Sarah Kerrigan from StarCraft series and Heroes of the Storm
 Pearl and Marina from Splatoon 2
 Persephone from God of War: Chains of Olympus
 Primrose Azelhart from Octopath Traveler
 Princess Daphne from Dragon's Lair
 Princess Peach Toadstool from Super Princess Peach, Super Mario Bros. 2, Super Mario RPG, and Mario + Rabbids Kingdom Battle
 Princess Zelda, Navi, Fi, Midna and Epona from The Legend of Zelda series
 Rayne the Dhampir from BloodRayne
 Reiko Nagase from Rave Racer and Ridge Racer
 Regina from Dino Crisis
 Rufu, Kairu, and Hamusu from Battle Zeque Den
 Ripple from Magical Chase GB: Minarai Mahoutsukai Kenja no Tani e
 Rynn from Drakan: Order of the Flame
 SHODAN from System Shock
 Saber and Tohsaka Rin from Fate/Stay Night
 Samus Aran, Gandrayda, and Mother Brain from the Metroid series
 Sarah Bryant, Aoi Umenokoji, Eileen, Pai Chan and Vanessa Lewis from Virtua Fighter
 Shantae from Shantae
 Shion Uzuki and KOS-MOS from Xenosaga
 Sophitia, Hildegard von Krone, Talim, Taki, Seong Mi-na, Setsuka, Tira, Xianghua and Ivy Valentine from the Soulcalibur series
 The Boss, EVA, Quiet, Meryl Silverburgh, and Sniper Wolf from Metal Gear series
 Trish, Lucia, and Lady from Devil May Cry series
 Twintelle from Arms
 Tyris Flare from Golden Axe
 Ulala from Space Channel 5
 Yuri Sakazaki from Art of Fighting
 Yuri Kozukata from Fatal Frame: Maiden of Black Water
 Zero from Drakengard 3
 Ajna from Indivisible
 Akira (female twin) from Astral Chain
 Akira Nakata from "Panic Museum"
 Alana McKendricks from Fighting Force
 Alexandra Roivas from Eternal Darkness
 Alice Liddell from American McGee's Alice
 Alicia Claus from Bullet Witch
 Aline Cedrac from Alone in the Dark: The New Nightmare
 Alis "Alisa" Landale from Phantasy Star I
 Angelina Bradshaw from Dark Arena
 Anna from Dark Angel: Vampire Apocalypse
 Anna Grimsdottir from Splinter Cell
 Annet Myer from El Viento and Anett Futatabi
 Anya Stroud, Myrrah Samantha Byrne, Sofia Hendrik and Kait Diaz from Gears of War (2006–present)
 Ann from ANNO: Mutationem
 Aoi Yasaka from Demon Chaos
 Ariel from Aretha
 Asha from Monster World IV
 Aska from Teenage Mutant Ninja Turtles: Tournament Fighters (SNES version)
 Ayano Aishi-Chan from Yandere Simulator
 Aurora from Child of Light
 Aya Brea from Parasite Eve
 Aya from OneeChanbara
 Ayumi from X-Blades and Blades of Time
 Ayumi Shinozaki, Sachiko Shinozaki, Naomi Nakashima, Satsuki Mizuhara and Ayame Itou from Corpse Party
 Belle MacFae from Mystik Belle
 Caeda, Celica, Lachesis, Mareeta, Sue, Lyn, Lilina, Eirika, Elincia, Micaiah, Anna, Lissa, Lucina, Sumia, Robin, Hinoka, Camilla and Edelgard from Fire Emblem series
 Carmilla, Sypha Belnades, Maria Renard, Carrie Fernández, Shanoa, Charlotte Aulin, Stella Lecarde, Loretta Lecarde, Yoko and Celia Fortner from Castlevania series
 Christine from Arkista's Ring
 Coco Bandicoot, Nina Cortex, and Pasadena O'Possum from Crash Bandicoot series
 Cornet Espoir from Marl Kingdom
 Cortana from Halo
 Cotton the Witch from Cotton
 CJ from Eiyuden Chronicle: Rising
 Dawn from Contrast
 Dixie Kong and Tiny Kong from Donkey Kong Country 3: Dixie Kong's Double Trouble!, Donkey Kong 64 and Donkey Kong Country: Tropical Freeze
 Dana Mercer, Elizabeth Greene, and Sabrina Galloway from [PROTOTYPE] series
 Ellie from Monster Tale
 Serena from Phantis and Ultionus: A Tale of Petty Revenge
 Elspeth "Doc" Holliday from Blair Witch Volume I: Rustin Parr
 Emily Hartwood from Alone in the Dark
 Farah from Prince of Persia: The Sands of Time
 Fiona Belli from Demento
 Fuji/Elena from Sword of Mana (Mystic Quest)
 Fury from Darksiders III
 Fetch (Abigail Walker) from Infamous First Light
 Gabriella Saunders and Sara Hartwood from Alone in the Dark: Illumination
 Gaige, Lilith, Maya, Athena, Aurelia, Nisha, Mad Moxxi, Moze, Amara and Fiona from Borderlands
 Giana from Giana Sisters DS and Giana Sisters: Twisted Dreams
 Hat Girls from A Hat in Time
 Hibana from Kunoichi
 Hinako Shirai from Blue Reflection
 Hiromi Tengenji from Burning Force
 Ihadurca from Fūjin Ryōiki Erutsuvāyu
 Isabel Greyhound, Maeve Falcon, Ornella, Eruina, Jezebeth and Biara from Heroes of Might and Magic V
 Janis from Inuyasha: Secret of the Divine Jewel
 Jen from Primal
 Jennifer from Rule of Rose
 Jennifer Simpson, Helen Maxwell, Alyssa Hale, and Alyssa Hamilton from Clock Tower
 Jenosa Arma from Scurge: Hive
 Jesse Faden from Control
 Josephine "Jo" (Mai Tsurugino) from Kendo Rage (Makeruna!)
 Juliet Starling from Lollipop Chainsaw
 Juli Kidman from The Evil Within
 Kate Walker from Syberia franchise
 Katjaa, Carley and Christa from The Walking Dead (video game)
 Katy and Lammy from Um Jammer Lammy
 Kawase Umihara from Umihara Kawase series
 Kit Ballard from Blade Kitten
 Konoko (Mai Hasegawa) from Oni
 Kurenai from Red Ninja: Blood River Dance
 Kya from Kya: Dark Lineage
 Latis from Bloody Vampire
 Layla from Layla
 Leah from "DeadStorm Pirates"
 Linda from Stretch Panic
 Lisa Rogan and Kate Green from The House of the Dead
 Luca from Labyrinth of Refrain: Coven of Dusk
 Lucia (Pheromone Contra), Tasha, Sheena Etranzi/CX-2, Black Viper, Tsugu-Min/BR-W9, Krystal, Sayuri, Sally Inohara, Erica Ricci, and Ms. Harakiri from Contra series
 Lucy from Whacked!
 Madeleine Valois from The Royal Trap
 Marina Liteyears from Mischief Makers
 Marlone from Atelier Marie: The Alchemist of Salburg
 Matsuri Kudo from Bleach: The 3rd Phantom
 Mannax from Blades of Vengeance
 Max Caulfied, Rachel Amber and Chloe Price from Life Is Strange and the prequel Before the Storm
 Mira from Star Wars Knights of the Old Republic II: The Sith Lords
 Momohime from Muramasa: The Demon Blade
 Mona De Lafitte from A Vampyre Story
 Marianne from The Medium
 Monica Flores and Rooney Simpson from NightCry
 Mia from Wife Quest
 Maya from Septerra Core
 Ms. Pac-Man from Midway Manufacturing arcade games, Ms. Pac-Man Maze Madness and Ms. Pac-Man: Quest for the Golden Maze
 Nariko from Heavenly Sword
 Natasha Volkova and Tanya from Command & Conquer: Red Alert series
 Naomi Hayward from The Good Life
 Nicole Collard (in Broken Sword 2 in 5) from Broken Sword
 Norah and Beth from Let's Go Jungle!: Lost on the Island of Spice and Let's Go Island: Lost on the Island of Tropics
 Popful Mail from Popful Mail: Magical Fantasy Adventure
 Princess Ailish and Buki from Sudeki
 Princess Allura and Laegrinna from Trapt and Deception IV: Blood Ties
 Princess Kameo from Kameo: Elements of Power
 Princess Minerva from Princess Minerva
 Princess Rilule from Étoile Princesse
 Princess Sia from Lady Sia
 Princess Solange Blanchefleur de Lux from Code of Princess
 Rachel Alucard, Noel Vermillion, Es Mitsurugi (Nobody), Platinum the Trinity, Bullet, Celica A. Mercury, Makoto Nanaya, Kokonoe, Mu-12 and Nu-13 from BlazBlue
 Rin Kagura from Calling: Kuroki Chakushin
 Rianna Saren from Star Wars: Lethal Alliance
 Roll, Roll.EXE (NetNavi of Mayl Sakurai), Roll Caskett, Alia, Iris, Ciel, Aile, Ashe, and Luna Plaz from Mega Man series
 Rooney Simpson and Monica Flores from NightCry
 Rustea "Rusty" Sprincul from Rusty
 Sakura Shinguji and Erica Fontaine from Sakura Taisen
 Sarah Lyons from Fallout 3
 Sayo-chan/Pocky from KiKi KaiKai
 Sheena from Run Saber
 Shelly "Bombshell" Harrison from Bombshell and Ion Fury (formerly Ion Maiden)
 Shoko from Liberation Maiden
 Saria from Twinkle Tale
 Skye from Darkened Skye
 Tennôboshi Uzume from Hyperdimension Neptunia series
 The Princess from Magical Pop'n
 Tron Bonne from The Misadventures of Tron Bonne
 Tiny Tina from Tiny Tina's Assault on Dragon Keep and Tiny Tina's Wonderlands
 Valkyrie from Valkyrie no Bōken: Toki no Kagi Densetsu and Valkyrie no Densetsu
 Vanessa Z. Schneider from P.N.03
 Velvet Crowe from Tales of Berseria
 Yuko Asou from Valis
 Lady Dahna from Dahna: Megami Tanjō
 Princess Yui Kutuna from Vanguard Princess
 Uranus, Ellis and Sofia from Battle Arena Toshinden
 Ulan from Astria Ascending
 Norah in Call of the Sea
 Amicia de Rune in A Plague Tale: Innocence
 Five survivors from "School Girl/Zombie Hunter"
 Laura Harris from D no Shokutaku/D's Diner
 Jeanette Marshall from Virtua Cop series
 Zaya from Thief 2X: Shadows of the Metal Age
 Alisa from Casper Croes
 Jean Clifford from Confidential Mission
 Arcueid Brunestud from Tsukihime
 Elle Moon from Clockwork Aquario
 Even from Lost in Random

See also
Girls with guns
List of male action heroes and villains

References

Lists of fictional heroes
Fictional women soldiers and warriors
Cultural studies
Feminist theory
Lists of fictional females
Action films
Action (genre)